Shrayer is a surname. Notable people with the surname include:

 David Shrayer-Petrov, (born 1936) Russian American novelist, poet, memoirist, translator and medical scientist 
 Maxim D. Shrayer (born 1967), Russian-American author, translator, and literary scholar
 Michael Shrayer, American creator of the Electric Pencil in 1976, the first word processor for home computers

See also 

 Schreyer 
 Scheier
 Shroyer